Number Five may refer to:

Chanel No. 5, a 1921 perfume, one of the best known in the world
Craig Jones (musician) (born 1972), American musician uses #5 as a pseudonym when performing with Slipknot
Johnny 5, or number 5 the main character from the Short Circuit film series
Number Five model Cylon,  the Aaron Doral model, a character from the 2003 reimagined Battlestar Galactica series
Number Five (album), a 2012 album by Tom Harrell
Number Five (single), a 2013 single by My Chemical Romance
Number Five / The Boy, a character from The Umbrella Academy
Numbuh Five, a character from Codename: Kids Next Door
No. 5, 1948, a painting by Jackson Pollock
Number 5 (Ling Tosite Sigure album), 2018
Number 5 (Steve Miller Band album), 1970

See also 
5 (number)
N5 (disambiguation)
5 (disambiguation)